Dissanayake Wijesuriyage Sandhya Darshani Gunasekara (born May 13, 1958 as නදීකා ගුණසේකර) [Sinhala]), popularly as Nadeeka Gunasekara, is an actress in Sri Lankan cinema and television. Gunasekara is best known for the character as Dan Chooty in film Chanchala Rekha by Sena Samarasinghe.

She is one of the five jury panel in 2018 Derana Film Awards.

Personal life
Nadeeka Gunasekara was born on 13 May 1958 in Kandy. Her father Stanley Gunasekara worked at Nawalapitiya post office. Her mother Thalatha Gunasekara was a school teacher and a popular film actress. When she was 3 year old, they moved to Charle's de Silva flats, Nawalapitiya. She started school with Udugoda Vidyalaya, then Uduheenthanna Senadhikara Vidyalaya. Due to her father being a post officer, they had to move to several cities, where Gunasekara then studied in Gampola. In 1973, she attended to Pushpadana Girls' College, Kandy and finally to Vishaka College, Bandarawela. She completed A/L from art stream in Mahamaya Girls' College, Kandy. She is a graduate of BA in Arts from the University of Kelaniya.

She is married to businessman Suren Hapuarachchi and in 2004, the couple had one daughter, Thenuki Sehansa.

Acting career
Her maiden cinematic experience came through 1980 film Kanchana directed by M.A. Sangadasa while doing A/Ls. Her most popular films include Kanchana, Chanchala Rekha, Biththi Hathara and Thani Tharuwa. She acted as leading actress in 19 films and has produced 2 films - Ahinsa and Aya Obata Barai. Her stage name, Nadeeka was given by Siri Kularatne.

Selected television serials

 Ada Sihinaya
 Chanchala Rekha
 Ganga Addara Kele
 Himi Ahimi
 Parasathu Malak
 Sandali Saha Radika 

 Paba

Filmography

Awards and accolades
She has won several awards at the local film festivals.

Unda Awards

|-
|| 1987 ||| Himi Ahimi || Best Actress ||

Sarasaviya Awards

|-
|| 1982 |||   || Lux Upcoming Actress || 
|-
|| 1985 ||| Batti || Best Performance || 
|- 
|| 1988 || Ahinsa || Best Performance || 
|-
|| 1994 || Chaya || Best Supporting Actress ||

Presidential Film Awards

|-
|| 1981 ||| Baddegama || Best Supporting Actress || 
|-
|| 1983 ||| Yahalu Yeheli || Merit Award || 
|-
|| 1993 ||| Chaya || Best Supporting Actress ||

References

External links
 Chat with Nadeeka Gunasekara
 Artistes airs their views in ‘Sundara Sandawe’
 හොදම නිළිය නොවූ දක්ෂ නිළියක්

Living people
Sri Lankan film actresses
1958 births